ASTC may refer to:
 Association of Science-Technology Centers, an international organization of science centers and science museums
 American Society of Theatre Consultants, a professional organization whose main goal is to apprise owners, contractors and/or architects of the services that a theatre consultant can perform, whether it be for a new or renovated facility.
 Antonov ASTC (Antonov Aeronautical Scientific/Technical Complex), a Ukraine-based aircraft manufacturing and services company
 All Students Take Calculus, a mathematical mnemonic
 Active Skid and Traction Control, the brand name of Mitsubishi Motors' electronic stability control system
 ASX Settlement and Transfer Corporation, the operator of the Australian Clearing House and Electronic Sub-register System (CHESS)
 Alamo Scouts Training Center, the training camp and headquarters of the U.S. Sixth Army Special Reconnaissance
 Assam State Transport Corporation, the road transport authority of the state of Assam, India
 Alice Springs Town Council, the local council for the Central Australian township of Alice Springs, Northern Territory, Australia
 Adaptive Scalable Texture Compression, a lossy block-based texture compression algorithm
 Succinylornithine transaminase, an enzyme
 Arab Satellite Television Charter, calling for regulation of satellite television broadcasting in Arab countries.